Yanosuke is a masculine Japanese given name.

Possible writings
Yanosuke can be written using different combinations of kanji characters. Here are some examples:

弥之助 or 彌之助, "more and more, of, help"
弥之介 or 彌之介, "more and more, of, mediate"
弥之輔 or 彌之輔, "more and more, of, help"
弥之丞 or 彌之丞, "more and more, of, help"
弥之甫 or 彌之甫, "more and more, of, begin"
野之助, "field, of, help"
野之介, "field, of, mediate"
野之輔, "field, of, help"
野之丞, "field, of, help"
野之甫, "field, of, begin"
矢之助, "arrow, of, help"
矢之介, "arrow, of, mediate"
矢之輔, "arrow, of, help"
矢之丞, "arrow, of, help"
矢之甫, "arrow, of, begin"
夜之助, "night, of, help"
夜之介, "night, of, mediate"

The name can also be written in hiragana やのすけ or katakana ヤノスケ.

Notable people with the name
, Japanese civil engineer
, Japanese businessman
, Japanese footballer
, Japanese geologist

Fictional characters
Yanosuke Hiiragi (柊 夜ノ介), from Tokimeki Memorial game series.

Japanese masculine given names